The Moydart Formation is a geologic formation in Nova Scotia. It preserves fossils dating back to the Silurian period.

See also

 List of fossiliferous stratigraphic units in Nova Scotia

References
 

Silurian Nova Scotia
Silurian southern paleotemperate deposits